The CSAIN Snia Milano (previously simply Snia Milano) is an Italian athletics club based in Milan, via Fatebenefratelli nº4.

Achievements
Snia Milano won 13 editions of the women's Italian Championships in Athletics for clubs (Campionati italiani di società di atletica leggera).
13 wins (1974, 1976, 1978, 1979, 1980, 1981, 1982, 1985, 1986, 1987, 1988, 1989, 1991)

Main athletes
Some of the most representative athletes in the history of SNIA Milan were the following.

Men
Ennio Preatoni
Sergio Bello
Dario Badinelli
Giampaolo Urlando

Women
Paola Pigni
Antonella Capriotti
Rita Bottiglieri
Patrizia Lombardo
Marisa Masullo
Rossella Tarolo
Daniela Ferrian
Laura Fogli

See also
Athletics in Italy
SNIA S.p.A.

References

External links
 Il bello delle... atlete

Athletics clubs in Italy